Knight and Bessborough Reservoirs is a  biological Site of Special Scientific Interest in Walton-on-Thames in Surrey. It is part of South West London Waterbodies Ramsar site and  Special Protection Area

Knight Reservoir and Bessborough Reservoir support many wildfowl, including nationally important numbers of wintering shovelers and substantial populations of gadwalls, cormorants and goldeneyes.

The site is private land with no public access.

References

Sites of Special Scientific Interest in Surrey
Ramsar sites in England
Special Protection Areas in England